Dante Sotgiu (31 May 1917 – 16 December 2003) was an Italian politician.

He was born in Terni, Italy in 1917 and died in Terni in 2003 at the age of 86.

He was member of the Italian Communist Party and was elected mayor of Terni in 1970. He served as mayor from 1970 to 1978. He was a councilor for several years.

He was a young officer of the Royal Italian Army. The municipality of Terni named a square in his memory.

See also
List of mayors of Terni

References

Italian Communist Party politicians
20th-century Italian politicians
21st-century Italian politicians
Mayors of Terni
1917 births
2003 deaths
People from Terni
20th-century Italian military personnel